Sir John Richards Harris  (24 January 1868 – 16 September 1946) was an Australian politician. A medical officer in early life, he is also noted as the first producer of sherry in Australia.

Life
He was born in Chiltern to miner Thomas Henry Harris and Mary Richards Hollow. He attended Grenville College in Ballarat and then the University of Melbourne (MB 1890, BSc 1891, MD 1902). From 1891 to 1892 he was the resident medical officer at Melbourne Hospital, and from 1892 was based in Rutherglen.

Harris served with the Australian Flying Corps during World War I. At Rutherglen he had become a viticulturist, producing the first sherry in Australia in 1912.

In 1920 Harris won a by-election for the Victorian Legislative Council's North Eastern Province; he was endorsed by the Victorian Farmers' Union, which soon became the Country Party. From 1925 to 1927 he was a minister without portfolio. He was expelled from the parliamentary Country Party in 1934 after refusing to sign the nomination form, but was soon readmitted; he retained his leadership of the Country Party in the Council, which he had had since 1928 and retained until 1942.

Harris was Minister of Public Instruction and Public Health from 1935 to 1942. Appointed a Knight Commander of the Order of the British Empire in 1937, he also served as chairman of the Council of Agricultural Education (1944–45) and the State Emergency Council (1939–42). Harris was defeated in 1946 and died later that year in Rutherglen.

Family
On 16 December 1896 Harris married Jessie Lily Prentice, with whom he had three sons.

References

1868 births
1946 deaths
National Party of Australia members of the Parliament of Victoria
Members of the Victorian Legislative Council
Australian Knights Commander of the Order of the British Empire
Australian politicians awarded knighthoods